Randolph F. Oduber (born March 18, 1989 in Paradera, Aruba) is a professional baseball outfielder for the Hoofddorp Pioniers of the Honkbal Hoofdklasse. He played for Team Netherlands in the 2019 European Baseball Championship, and at the Africa/Europe 2020 Olympic Qualification tournament in Italy in September 2019.

Career

Washington Nationals
Oduber was originally drafted by the San Francisco Giants in the 48th round of the 2009 Major League Baseball Draft, but he did not sign. The following draft, the Washington Nationals selected Oduber out of Western Oklahoma State College in the 32nd round. He made his professional debut for the GCL Nationals, and also played for the Single-A Hagerstown Suns, accumulating a .324/.387/.503 batting line between the two teams. He spent 2011 with the GCL Nationals and Hagerstown again, slashing .311/.373/.421 with 5 home runs and 26 RBI. He spent the 2012 season in High-A with the Potomac Nationals, hitting .252/.288/.383 in 80 games. He spent the majority of the 2013 season in Potomac, also appearing in 5 games for the Double-A Harrisburg Senators, and hit .232/.290/.337 with 4 home runs and 42 RBI. In 2014, Oduber played 1 game in Harrisburg, spending the rest of the year in Potomac, slashing .265/.301/.381 with career-highs in home runs (6) and RBI (51). He only appeared in 7 games for Harrisburg in 2016 due to injury, notching 3 hits in 16 at-bats. On April 2, 2016, Oduber was released by the Nationals organization.

Curaçao Neptunus
On May 21, 2016, Oduber signed with the Curaçao Neptunus of the Dutch Honkbal Hoofdklasse. Oduber posted a .353/.542/.412 batting line, but was limited to 8 games because of a hamstring injury.

Lincoln Saltdogs
On November 1, 2016, Oduber signed with the Lincoln Saltdogs of the American Association of Independent Professional Baseball. In 94 games in 2017, he slashed .286/.328/.482 with 17 home runs and 60 RBI. On January 4, 2018, Oduber re-signed with Lincoln for the 2018 season.

Fargo-Moorhead RedHawks
On April 4, 2018, Oduber was traded to the Fargo-Moorhead RedHawks. Oduber collected 20 hits in 80 at-bats for the RedHawks in 21 games.

Lincoln Saltdogs (second stint)
On July 19, 2018, Oduber re-signed with the Lincoln Saltdogs. He finished the season with Lincoln, hitting .346/.408/.520 with 7 home runs and 50 RBI. On December 13, 2018, Oduber re-signed with Lincoln. In 2019 for the Saltdogs, he slashed .284/.329/.410 with 9 home runs and 41 RBI in 79 games. Oduber was released on November 19, 2019.

Unipol Bologna
In September 2020, Oduber signed with the Unipol Bologna of the Italian Baseball League. He appeared in 8 games for the club, posting 9 hits in 31 at-bats, including 2 home runs.

Hoofddorp Pioniers
On April 20, 2021, Oduber signed with the Hoofddorp Pioniers of the Honkbal Hoofdklasse.

International career
He played for Team Netherlands in the 2013 World Baseball Classic, 2014 European Baseball Championship, 2015 WBSC Premier12, 2016 Haarlem Baseball Week, and the 2016 European Baseball Championship. He played for Team Netherlands in the 2019 European Baseball Championship, and at the Africa/Europe 2020 Olympic Qualification tournament in Italy in September 2019.

References

External links

1989 births
2013 World Baseball Classic players
2016 European Baseball Championship players
2017 World Baseball Classic players
Aruban expatriate baseball players in the United States
Gulf Coast Nationals players
Hagerstown Suns players
Harrisburg Senators players
Living people
Potomac Nationals players
Curacao Neptunus players
Lincoln Saltdogs players
Fargo-Moorhead RedHawks players
2019 European Baseball Championship players
Águilas del Zulia players
Expatriate baseball players in Venezuela
Expatriate baseball players in Italy
Unipol Bologna players